Cougar Reservoir (also known as Cougar Lake) is a reservoir on the South Fork McKenzie River in the U.S. state of Oregon. In 1963 the United States Army Corps of Engineers built Cougar Dam on the river primarily to generate hydroelectricity and control flooding, and the reservoir formed behind the dam.

The lake is also used for recreation, including boating, fishing, swimming, and waterskiing. The United States Forest Service maintains three campgrounds—Cougar Crossing, Slide Creek, and Sunnyside—near the reservoir, with opportunities for hiking and picnicking as well as camping. Other campgrounds in the general vicinity include French Pete and Delta. Terwilliger Hot Springs is along Rider Creek just west of the lake.

Cougar Reservoir supports populations of stocked rainbow trout and stocked landlocked Chinook salmon as well as naturally reproducing cutthroat trout. Fishing for rainbow trout, especially in winter, is said to be "fair". The lake also supports bull trout, but it is not legal to catch and keep them.

See also
 List of lakes in Oregon

References

External links
 Cougar Dam and Lake – U.S. Army Corps of Engineers
 McKenzie Watershed Council

Reservoirs in Oregon
Lakes of Lane County, Oregon
Buildings and structures in Lane County, Oregon
Protected areas of Lane County, Oregon
Willamette National Forest
1963 establishments in Oregon